Bhawani Lal Verma (12 January 1926 – 30 December 2000) was an Indian politician. He was elected to the Lok Sabha, lower house of the Parliament of India as a member of the Indian National Congress.

Verma penned several other books along with Dr. Vinay Kumar Pathak like "Hindi ka sampurna vyakaran", "Chhattisgarhi ka sampurna vyakaran".

Verma died on 30 December 2000, at the age of 74. One of his sons, Dr. Vinod Kumar Verma, is a distinguished personality who has made contributions to literature.

References

External links
 Official biographical sketch in Parliament of India website

1926 births
2000 deaths
India MPs 1991–1996
Lok Sabha members from Madhya Pradesh
Indian National Congress politicians
Indian National Congress politicians from Madhya Pradesh